The men's 3 metre springboard, also reported as springboard diving, was one of four diving events on the Diving at the 1988 Summer Olympics programme. Memorably, defending champion Greg Louganis managed to complete the preliminary qualifying after hitting his head on the springboard while performing a reverse 2½ pike in the third round and suffering a concussion, and continued to the finals to win the gold medal.

The competition was split into two phases:

Preliminary round (19 September)
Divers performed eleven dives. The twelve divers with the highest scores advanced to the final.
Final (20 September)
Divers performed another set of eleven dives and the score here obtained determined the final ranking.

Results

References

Sources
 

Men
1988
Men's events at the 1988 Summer Olympics